Rhabdion was a Late Antique fortress of the Roman Empire, located on the Tur Abdin plateau to the northeast of Nisibis on the border with the Sasanian Empire. It is now identified with Hatem Tai, a fortification in south-eastern Turkey.

It was probably built, along with Amida (Diyarbakır) and Cepha (Hasankeyf), by the emperor Constantius II. After the cession by the emperor Jovian of the five Transtigritine provinces and some border forts to the Sasanian Empire under Shapur II as a result of the Persians' victory in Julian's Persian War, Rhabdion became the easternmost Roman frontier outpost, perhaps even de facto exclave in Persian territory, since the only road to it appears to have been from the south, passing across the plain by the Persian-controlled city of Nisibis.

The Hatem Tai kalesi was visited in the early 1860s by John George Taylor, then British consul in Diyarbakır, who sketched its outline in his Travels in Kurdistan (Journal of the Royal Geographical Society, Vol. 35, 1865). At the time, the Hatem Tai kalesi was identified with another ancient fortress known from the history of the Roman–Persian Wars of Late Antiquity, Sisauranon. 

The kalesi may have given its name to the region of Tur Abdin.

References

Sources
 
 

Byzantine fortifications in Turkey
Former populated places in Turkey
Roman–Persian Wars
Byzantine sites in Turkey
Mesopotamia (Roman province)